The 1966 California Angels season, the team's first in Anaheim, involved the Angels finishing 6th in the American League with a record of 80 wins and 82 losses, 18 games behind the AL and World Series Champion Baltimore Orioles.

Offseason 
 November 29, 1965: Willie Montañez was drafted by the Angels from the St. Louis Cardinals in the 1965 first-year draft.
 December 2, 1965: Dick Simpson was traded by the Angels to the Baltimore Orioles for Norm Siebern.

Regular season

Season standings

Record vs. opponents

Notable transactions 
 May 5, 1966: Willie Montañez was returned by the Angels to the St. Louis Cardinals.
 June 7, 1966: Steve Hovley was drafted by the Angels in the 35th round of the 1966 Major League Baseball draft.
 August 12, 1966: Aurelio Rodríguez was purchased by the Angels from the Charros de Jalisco.

Roster

Player stats

Batting

Starters by position 
Note: Pos = Position; G = Games played; AB = At bats; H = Hits; Avg. = Batting average; HR = Home runs; RBI = Runs batted in

Other batters 
Note: G = Games played; AB = At bats; H = Hits; Avg. = Batting average; HR = Home runs; RBI = Runs batted in

Pitching

Starting pitchers 
Note: G = Games pitched; IP = Innings pitched; W = Wins; L = Losses; ERA = Earned run average; SO = Strikeouts

Other pitchers 
Note: G = Games pitched; IP = Innings pitched; W = Wins; L = Losses; ERA = Earned run average; SO = Strikeouts

Relief pitchers 
Note: G = Games pitched; W = Wins; L = Losses; SV = Saves; ERA = Earned run average; SO = Strikeouts

Farm system 

LEAGUE CHAMPIONS: Seattle

References

External links 
1966 California Angels team page at Baseball Reference
1966 California Angels team page at www.baseball-almanac.com

Los Angeles Angels seasons
California Angels season
Los